Bull Lake is a lake in geographic Varley Township in Algoma District, Ontario, Canada. The primary inflows are unnamed creeks from Bridge Lake and West Twin Lake, and the primary outflow is Bull Creek, which flows into the Little White River, a tributary of the Mississagi River.

See also
List of lakes in Ontario

References

Lakes of Algoma District